Julie Marion Depardieu (born 18 June 1973) is a French actress who has appeared in a number of successful films.

Early life
Born 18 June 1973 in Paris, she is the daughter of Gérard and Élisabeth Depardieu and the sister of the late Guillaume Depardieu – all of whom have worked as film actors. She has two paternal half-siblings: half-sister Roxane and half-brother Jean. 
 
She has two sons, Billy (born 16 June 2011) and Alfred (born 8 August 2012), with her partner musician Philippe Katerine.

Career
In 2004, she won two César Awards (Best Supporting Actress and Best Young Actress) for La petite Lili and won another (Best Supporting Actress) for Un secret in 2008. Depardieu was also nominated for a César Award for Best Supporting Actress in 2005 for her performance in Podium.

In 2008, she also directed her first operette les contes d'Hoffmann (Tales of Hoffmann) at the Vaux le Vicomte castle, the castle which inspired king Louis XIV to build Versailles.

Filmography

Theatre

References

External links

Julie Depardieu at Allmovie
Julie Depardieu at uniFrance

1973 births
Living people
Actresses from Paris
French film actresses
César Award winners
20th-century French actresses
21st-century French actresses
French television actresses
French stage actresses
Best Supporting Actress César Award winners
Most Promising Actress César Award winners
Julie